The elaws (Employment Laws Assistance for Workers and Small Businesses) Advisors are a set of interactive, online tools developed by the U.S. Department of Labor to help employers and employees learn more about their rights and responsibilities under numerous Federal employment laws. They address some of the nation's most widely applicable employment laws, offering easy-to-understand information on areas such as:

 Pay and overtime
 Family and medical leave
 Health benefits
 Disability discrimination
 Workplace safety and health
 Union elections
 Veterans’ employment
 Youth employment
 Federal contractor requirements

elaws Advisors are free and mimic the interaction someone would have with an employment law expert by asking specific questions and providing tailored information based on individual situations and circumstances. Depending on the topic, questions might pertain to industry, staff size and how long a particular employee has worked for his or her employer. All questions offer pre-set answers to choose from, and no information provided is recorded or stored in any system.  elaws can be located at www.dol.gov/elaws. elaws address some of the nation's most widely applicable employment laws. The following is a list of all elaws Advisors. Please note that elaws Advisors have not yet been built for every U.S. Department of Labor law and regulation.

 Disability Nondiscrimination Law Advisor
 Drug-Free Workplace Advisor
 ERISA Fiduciary Advisor
 Family & Medical Leave Act (FMLA) Advisor 
 Federal Contractor Compliance Advisor
 FirstStep Employment Law Overview Advisor
 FirstStep Recordkeeping, Reporting, and Notices Advisor
 FirstStep Poster Advisor
 Fair Labor Standards Act (FLSA) Advisor
 FLSA Coverage & Employment Status Advisor
 FLSA Overtime Calculator Advisor
 FLSA Overtime Security Advisor 
 FLSA Hours Worked Advisor
 FLSA Child Labor Rules Advisor
 FLSA Section 14 (c) Advisor (Special Minimum Wage)
 H-1B Advisor
 Health Benefits Advisor
 Health Benefits Advisor for Employers
 MSHA Online Forms Advisor 
 MSHA Training Plan Advisor 
 MSHA Fire Suppression & Fire Protection Advisor
 OLMS Union Elections Advisor
 OSHA Confined Spaces Advisor
 OSHA Fire Safety Advisor
 OSHA Hazard Awareness Advisor
 OSHA Lead in Construction Advisor
 OSHA Recordkeeping Advisor 
 OSHA Software Expert Advisors
 Poster Advisor
 Reallifelines Advisor
 Small Business Retirement Savings Advisor 
 Uniformed Services Employment and Reemployment Rights Act (USERRA) Advisor 
 Veterans' Preference Advisor
 e-VETS Resource Advisor
 Worker Adjustment and Retraining Notification Act (WARN) Advisor

References

External links
www.dol.gov/elaws

United States Department of Labor